Berlin-Marzahn-Hellersdorf is an electoral constituency (German: Wahlkreis) represented in the Bundestag. It elects one member via first-past-the-post voting. Under the current constituency numbering system, it is designated as constituency 85. It is located in eastern Berlin, comprising the Marzahn-Hellersdorf borough.

Berlin-Marzahn-Hellersdorf was created for the inaugural 1990 federal election after German reunification. Since 2021, it has been represented by Mario Czaja of Christian Democratic Union (CDU).

Geography
Berlin-Marzahn-Hellersdorf is located in eastern Berlin. As of the 2021 federal election, it is coterminous with the Marzahn-Hellersdorf borough.

History
Berlin-Marzahn-Hellersdorf was created after German reunification in 1990. Until 2002, it was named Berlin-Hellersdorf-Marzahn. In the 1990 election, it was constituency 261 in the numbering system. In the 1994 and 1998 elections, it was number 260. In the 2002 through 2009 elections, it was number 86. Since the 2013 election, it has been number 85. Its borders have not changed since its creation.

Members
Berlin-Marzahn – Hellersdorf was considered a safe seat for The Left and its predecessor Party of Democratic Socialism (PDS), which won the constituency in every election since 1990 and even in the 2002 German federal election, where it was only one of two seats the then-PDS won nationwide. However, Petra Pau, who first won the seat in 2002 following the retirement of incumbent member Gregor Gysi, lost re-election in the 2021 German federal election. She lost by nearly eight percentage points to Mario Czaja (CDU), who had previously won a Abgeordnetenhaus of Berlin constituency entirely within the borough (Marzahn-Hellersdorf 5) multiple times by large margins.

Election results

2021 election

2017 election

2013 election

2009 election

References

Federal electoral districts in Berlin
Marzahn-Hellersdorf
1990 establishments in Germany
Constituencies established in 1990